Basil Tudor Guy (9 March 1910 – 29 April 1975) was an Anglican bishop in the 20th century.

Guy was born on 9 March 1910 and educated at Forest School and Keble College, Oxford. After a curacy at Wanstead, he was Vicar of  Bradninch then St Eustachius' Church, Tavistock  before his appointment as Archdeacon of Bedford in 1956. A year later he was elevated to  Bishop of Bedford in 1957. Five years later he was translated to Gloucester where he stayed until his death from cancer on 29 April 1975.

References

1910 births
People educated at Forest School, Walthamstow
Alumni of Keble College, Oxford
Bishops of Bedford
Bishops of Gloucester
Archdeacons of Bedford
1975 deaths
People from Wanstead
20th-century Church of England bishops